Brachyale is a genus of beetle in the family Cerambycidae. Its sole species is Brachyale pterolophioides. It was described by Stephan von Breuning in 1963.

References

Pteropliini
Beetles described in 1963